Castle Hill High School, located in Castle Street, Castle Hill, New South Wales, Australia, is a co-educational and comprehensive school with students ranging from year 7 to year 12, established in 1963. Castle Hill High School generally performs well in the HSC, with many students achieving band 6s each year. In 2018, 231 were achieved, and one student attained  the maximum possible rank in the state for their subject. Five students also received an all rounder award for achieving band 6s for a total of all their subjects. The school was recognised by Better Education HSC in their Sound Demonstration of merit regarding Effort in Mathematics and English, coming 84th in New South Wales as of late 2018 on the list.

Co-curricular activities 
Castle Hill High School can be noted by their strong participation in extracurricular activities, including sport, musical production, leadership, technology and public competitions. Additionally, the school has a high level of participation and commitment to various charitable events, with a high volunteer rate in activities such as the 40 Hour Famine, Relay For life, The Salvation Army Red Shield Door Knock Appeal and the World's Greatest Shave.

Sport 
Castle Hill High School holds various sporting events including Swimming, Cross-Country and Athletics Carnivals, where students can compete for participation in wider regional competitions, consisting of Zone (representing the school), Regionals (representing Hills Zone) and Combined High Schools (representing Sydney West). The school is in association with the New South Wales Combined High Schools Sports Association, meaning that it competes with other comprehensive schools around the Sydney region. Generally, the school performs outstandingly in terms of Swimming and Athletics Carnivals, usually accumulating exponential numbers of points over other schools. Castle Hill High School also participates in many other competitions and tournaments with other schools, including:
 Zone, Regional, or State Representative Teams
 The Brewer Cup, a challenge between the school and Crestwood High school involving various sporting activities
 Knockout Regional Teams (Including Hockey, Basketball, Netball, Waterpolo)

Additionally, the schools holds many sporting events within the school to encourage increased participation in physical activity including:
 Dedicating 2 periods a week solely to sport between Years 7-10, consisting of travelling to C2K, Fitness First Castle Towers, Slider Hockey, Basketball, etc.
 Castle Hill High School's 3 VS 3 Basketball Competition

In commemoration of student achievements in terms of their sporting efforts, the Physical Education faculty holds yearly excursions in the end of the year to Jamberoo or White Water Rafting to the top 50 students who achieve the most points. These points are varied in terms of the difficulty of acquiring the accolade and are determined by sporting achievements such as representing the school in State representative teams, to acquiring one of the top 30 places in the school's Cross Country.

Academic and public competitions 
The school provides many avenue for students to pursue, indicating to the student their academic level, have new experiences, and improve on certain skills such as communication and public speaking. This includes:
 Robocup
 Debating
 Moot court Trials
 Interschool Imagination Forum
 Australian Maths Competition
 UNSW Academic competitions consisting of Writing, Comprehension, Computing skills and Science

Leadership 
 Student Representative Council (SRC) - A group of junior students elected by their peers to represent the school and help with the organisation of events
 Peer Support Leader - Leaders in Year 10 who help new students settle into the school
 Prefects - A body of senior students who represent the school as well as organise events
 The Duke of Edinburgh's Award

Music, performing and visual arts 
 Showcase
 Annual School Musical Production
 School Concert Band
 School String Ensemble
 Rock Band
 Super band (a brass band, occasionally accompanying singers)
In addition to these groups, Castle Hill High School allows for performances such as singing, playing musical instruments and dancing during weekly assemblies.

Enrichment and welfare programs 
 Various charitable events such as the Relay For Life, 40 Hour Famine and the Salvation Army Door Knock Appeal
 Japanese and French Exchange programs
 First Aid Program
 Mentoring Program
 Chess Club

Notable alumni 

 Garrett Swearingen, most noted for exceptional service to the Queensland climate movement. Aspiring to become Australia's first Independent Prime Minister, Garrett dares anyone to try and stop him.  Also a well regarded sportsman, Garrett placed 40 of 120 competitors in his 2021 debut at the prestigious Great Pyramid Race in Gordonvale, Queensland.

References

External links 
 Castle Hill High School website

Public high schools in Sydney
School buildings completed in 1963
Educational institutions established in 1963
1963 establishments in Australia
Castle Hill, New South Wales